Muhazi is a district (akarere) of the Rwandan province of Kibungo. Population: 58,492 (2002 figures); area: 150 square kilometers.

References 
 

Districts and municipalities of Kibungo